Josephine, Guardian Angel (Joséphine, ange gardien) is a French television series. It has been aired since 1997 on TF1 (France).

Plot 
Joséphine Delamarre is a guardian angel that Heaven sends to earth. With her psychological insight, ability of persuasion and her magical powers, she manages to help people who have problems. She appears at the beginning of each mission; when the mission is completed, she disappears by snapping her fingers.

Episodes

Season 1 - Pilot (1997)

Season 2 (1998)

Season 3 (1999)

Season 4 (2000)

Season 5 (2001)

Season 6 (2002)

Season 7 (2003)

Season 8 (2004)

Season 9 (2005)

Season 10 (2006)

Season 11 (2007)

Season 12 (2008)

Season 13 (2009)

Season 14 (2012)

Season 15 (2011)

Season 16 (2015)

Season 17 (2016)

Season 18 (2017)

Season 19 (2018)

Season 20 (2019)

Awards 
Mimie Mathy has received the 7 d'Or for Favorite Actress in a Fictional Series three times, in 1998, 2000 and 2003. In 2003, the series also received a 7 d'Or for Favorite TV Series.

See also
 List of French television series

References

External links

1997 French television series debuts
TF1 original programming